Last Knight may refer to:

Books
The Last Knight: The Twilight of the Middle Ages and the Birth of the Modern Era, a 2005 nonfiction book written by the medievalist Norman Cantor
The Last Knight, a 2000 graphic novel Will Eisner
The Last Knight, a novel by Hilari Bell

Film and television
Last Knights, a 2015 American fantasy film with Clive Owen
Transformers: The Last Knight, a 2017 American science fiction action film
Last Knight (film), a 2017 Russian film

Individuals
Maximilian I, Holy Roman Emperor (22 March 1459 – 12 January 1519) Frequently referred to as "The Last Knight"
Franz von Sickingen (2 March 1481 – 7 May 1523) was a German knight who, along with Ulrich von Hutten, led the Knight's Revolt and was one of the most notable figures of the early period of the Reformation. Sometimes referred to as The Last Knight.
Pierre Terrail, seigneur de Bayard (1476 - 30 April 1524) was a French knight referred to as The Last Knight

See also
Last Night (disambiguation)